The Groningen gas field is a natural gas field in Groningen province in the northeastern part of the Netherlands. With an estimated 2,740 billion cubic metres of recoverable natural gas it is the largest natural gas field in Europe and one of the largest in the world.

The gas field was discovered in 1959 near Slochteren. The subsequent extraction of the natural gas became central to the energy supply in the Netherlands. Virtually all of the Netherlands was connected to Groningen gas in the following years. Revenue from natural gas production became important in the post-war development and construction of the Dutch welfare state. As of 2013, 2,057 billion cubic metres of natural gas had been extracted from the field.

Gas extraction resulted in subsidence above the field. From 1991 this was also accompanied by earthquakes. This led to damage to houses and unrest among residents. It was decided to phase out gas extraction from 2014 onwards. The Groningen gas field is expected to be closed between 2025 and 2028, with the possibility of bringing this forward. The reinforcement operation and damage settlement as a result of the earthquakes are progressing slowly. The National Ombudsman called this a "national crisis" in 2021.

History

Discovery 
Natural gas was initially mainly a by-product of petroleum, which was more economically attractive. This gave rise to the expectation that more natural gas fields could be found in the Netherlands. In the north and east of the country they searched for gas fields, including near the later Groningen gas field. In 1954 and 1955 drilling at Haren and  yielded nothing. On October 24, 1955, when seeking oil at Thesinge, natural gas was found in the Zechstein formation, but they drilled 40 to 50 meters too little to discover the Groningen gas field.

On May 29, 1959, the NAM started exploratory research on land owned by farmer Kees Boon, near Kolham in the municipality of Slochteren. Two months later on July 22, the drilling led to the discovery of natural gas for the first time. Initially it received little media attention, because little was known about its size at the time. The flaring did attract local attention. The fact that it was a large gas field became clear when gas was found near Delfzijl in 1960. The properties of that natural gas matched those of Slochteren, so had to be the same gas field. These findings about the size were initially kept secret, also from NAM shareholder Esso.

The size was not made public until October 14, 1960. A Belgian newspaper reported on a speech by Belgian Member of the European Parliament Victor Leemans, in which he mentioned that the Netherlands had found a gas field of 300 billion m³. The cabinet responded to parliamentary questions that a large amount of natural gas had indeed been found, but kept it at 60 billion m³. Behind closed doors, it was then estimated at a maximum of 100 billion m³.

Concession 

After the discovery, NAM applied for the concession for the field. At the initiative of Esso employee Douglass Stewart, NAM planned to sell the gas directly to households. The Dutch government had previously committed itself to purchase all natural gas extracted in the Netherlands. The size of the Groningen gas field made this promise financially untenable. Minister of Economic Affairs Jan de Pous entered into negotiations with NAM about gas extraction. Shell and Esso initially wanted a substantial majority share in the extraction and sale, to the disapproval of De Pous. On the other hand, the Labour Party wanted a greater role for the government. Member of Parliament Anne Vondeling argued for complete nationalization. After more than a year and a half of negotiations, De Pous sent his plan to the Tweede Kamer on 17 July 1962. This regulated the tasks of various parties.

It was decided to regulate the exploitation of the Groningen field in the "Maatschap Groningen". The decision to create a maatschap was intended to conceal the fact that the Dutch government participated in natural gas extraction. With this they tried, among other things, to prevent sheikhs in the Middle East from following the Dutch example of also claiming profits from Shell and Esso, who extracted oil there. At that time, the deliberate avoidance of transparency was already criticized by, among others, the Minister of Justice Albert Beerman.

In the plan, the foundations were also laid for the establishment of the Gasunie. 10% of its shares were directly owned by the Dutch state, 40% by the Staatsmijnen and 50% shared by Shell and Esso. The Gasunie was given the task of laying a pipeline network to connect the whole of the Netherlands to Groningen gas. In cities where town gas was already being used, the existing pipes were used. In December 1968 it was celebrated that Egmond aan Zee was the last municipality to be connected to Groningen natural gas.

A Cooperation Agreement was signed on March 4, 1963 by the Staatsmijnen, NAM, Shell and Esso. In this agreement, further agreements were written down between the parties. On May 30, 1963, the concession was then granted to NAM.

Resistance 
The plans were largely supported by the Dutch House of Representatives. Only the Groningen Member of Parliament  noted that gas extraction in the United States and Italy had led to subsidence. According to De Pous this was not the case with the Groningen gas field and this would otherwise be reimbursed by the NAM and Staatsmijnen. In an article in the Nieuwsblad van het Noorden, engineer Willem Meiborg warned on 8 November 1963 about subsidence. He predicted subsidence of up to one meter. He asked to set aside money for the consequences. Publicly, NAM denied Meiborg's prediction, but secretly ordered an investigation. The investigation confirmed that subsidence could occur, as much as 1.5 meters. The research was shared with the province of Groningen, but was not made public. It only became public when D66 Member of Parliament Jan Terlouw found out about the research in 1972 and asked parliamentary questions about it.

On paper, the discovery of the gas field made Groningen the richest region in the Netherlands. Some in Groningen were pleased with the jobs created by gas extraction. Others thought that the economically disadvantaged province was not benefiting enough from the extraction. Prominently, CPN politician Fré Meis from Groningen complained about what he regarded as injustice. This sentiment returned regularly in the decades that followed.

Small fields policy 

Until 1959, it had been assumed that the North Sea had no natural gas and oil. This opinion changed after the discovery of the Groningen gas field. In the decade after the discovery they successfully searched for fields in the North Sea.

Initially it was expected that nuclear energy would eventually replace the use of natural gas. Efforts were made to sell natural gas as quickly as possible, both at home and abroad. In the mid-1970s, this policy was revised after the oil crisis of 1973 and the great social resistance to the deployment of nuclear energy. That is why the desire arose to keep the Groningen gas field as a reserve. Therefore, the small fields policy was introduced in 1974. The aim of this policy was to extract more natural gas from smaller fields, including in the North Sea, to limit the production in the Groningen gas field. Because small fields entailed higher operating costs, the Dutch government reduced its profit share to make exploitation more attractive.

Earthquakes
The first earthquake induced by a Dutch natural gas field occurred in 1986 near Assen, induced by the Eleveld gas field. Local politician  argued that there was a connection between gas extraction in the Groningen field and the earthquake. On December 4, 1991, the first induced earthquake of the Groningen field was measured, with a magnitude of 2.4 on the Richter scale. In 1993, after research, NAM recognized a link between earthquakes and gas extraction. In the following decades, the number of induced earthquakes increased. Along with the earthquakes, resistance against gas extraction also increased.

According to a 2015 report by the Dutch Safety Board, until 2013, "the safety of the citizens of Groningen in relation to induced earthquakes had not influenced decision-making about the exploitation of the Groningen field." With an estimated moment magnitude of 3.6, it was the heaviest earthquake measured above the Groningen gas field. SodM recommended limiting gas extraction quickly, and as much as possible. 

In January 2013, the Minister of Economic Affairs Henk Kamp decided not to limit gas extraction immediately, but requested fourteen investigations. The report also coincided with austerity measures, which made the government reluctant to reduce natural gas revenues. At the end of the year it was announced that about 10% more gas, 54 billion cubic meters, had been extracted than previous years, according to the NAM because of the cold.

Phasing out gas production  
In 2014, gas production from the Groningen gas field was limited due to earthquakes for the first time. In January 2014, Kamp announced that it would limit production to 42.5 billion m³ in 2014. At the beginning of 2015, the Dutch cabinet decided that a maximum of 39.4 billion m³ of gas could be produced from the gas field in that calendar year, which was further reduced to 30 billion m³ in June 2015. In November 2015, the Council of State lowered the limit to 27 billion m³. A month later, Kamp decided to maintain this maximum. In September 2016 it was subsequently decided to further limit gas extraction to 21.6 billion m³. A year later, the Council of State concluded that this decision was insufficiently motivated and that it had to be renewed.

In October 2017, Eric Wiebes became the new Minister of Economic Affairs and Climate. It was the third strongest in magnitude, but was perceived as stronger due to higher ground acceleration. In March 2018, Wiebes announced that gas extraction in the Groningen field had to be reduced to zero by 2030 at the latest. The extraction plan was again rejected by the Council of State in July 2019. Wiebes then announced an accelerated phasing out, whereby gas extraction would be stopped by 2022 during normal winters. Not much later, however, this turned out to be too optimistic. As of 2021, the expectation is that the Groningen field will be closed between 2025 and 2028, with the possibility of bringing this forward.

Claims handling, reinforcement and compensation 

In addition to phasing out gas extraction, various measures were taken. Between 2014 and 2020, three times more than a billion euros was pledged for reinforcement, handling claims and compensation. The  was established in 2014 to further distance the claims handling process from NAM. Despite these measures, claims handling and reinforcement are progressing slowly. In 2020, the SodM calculated that the reinforcement operation will take another 20 years, but the Inspector General of the SodM demanded that these should be completed by 2028. In October 2021, National Ombudsman  called the issue a "national crisis". The gas extraction of the Groningen gas field and the problems it has caused is as of 2021 subject of the parliamentary inquiry into natural gas extraction Groningen.

Geology 

The source rock of the Groningen gas field, the stratum from which the natural gas originated, is the upper part of the Carboniferous sequence. During the late Carboniferous period, the Netherlands was located on the equator and was covered by tropical swamp forests. In South Limburg this layer was shallow enough for coal mines, but in Groningen it was 3.3 kilometres underground. Natural gas was generated from the type-III kerogen in that coal-rich layer as it became heated by further burial.

This gas then rose to the overlying Upper Rotliegend from the early part of the Permian epoch. This layer had a porosity of 15-20% and a permeability of 0.1-3000 mD. During the Permian period, the area consisted of desert, of which the sand came from the Variscan orogen. The best petroleum reservoirs are located in fine-grained aeolian dune sand. In the case of the Groningen gas field, there is a lot of gas in the coarser granular fluvial wadi sand. The reservoir is located between 2,600 and 3,200 meters underground. Above the Upper Rotliegend is the Zechstein layer, which forms the seal rock. This layer contains impermeable carbonate, halite and anhydrite layers, so that the gas remained trapped in the Upper Rotliegend.

The Groningen structure is a long-lived high, cut by many faults, most of which are normal in type. The faults were formed, and in many cases subsequently reactivated, during the phases of rifting and later inversion that have affected the area. There is evidence of some active faulting during the deposition of the Rotliegend regionally, although not at Groningen itself. The main rift phase occurred during the Late Jurassic to Early Cretaceous period. The domininant fault orientation is NNW–SSE trending, with some faults also running W–E and N–S. The area was affected by a number of phases of shortening associated with the Alpine orogeny during the Late Cretaceous to Paleogene, which locally reactivated normal faults in reverse sense. The faults have some impact on production in the field, although the constant gas composition and lack of pressure changes between fault blocks suggest that few of the faults are acting as barriers.

Properties Groningen gas  

The gas from the Groningen gas field is characterized by a high percentage of dinitrogen in the composition. The high percentage of the non-combustible nitrogen ensures a low calorific value. When burned, the Groningen gas yields 35.17 megajoule per cubic meter (MJ/m³). Due to the deviating calorific value and higher pressure, gas-consuming appliances had to be fitted with other burners after 1963 or replaced completely. Conversely, when gas production was being phased out, nitrogen had to be added to imported high-calorific gas. To this end, work has been underway since 2020 on a nitrogen plant in Zuidbroek.

Size 
The gas field is spread out over approximately 900 square kilometers. Estimates of the size of the gas field have risen sharply since its discovery in 1959. After the drilling success in Delfzijl, the size of the gas field was estimated at 60 billion m³. The search continued and the gas estimates were revised upwards; in the autumn of 1962 the estimate was 470 billion m³; in October 1963 already 1110 billion m³ and in 1967 2000 billion m³. With the knowledge of 2010, the recoverable gas stock is estimated at 2700 billion m³. The recoverable gas stock depends on the technology and price of the gas, because at higher prices more reserves are economically recoverable.

Production

At its peak, the Groningen field had 29 extraction clusters. Spread over these clusters were approximately 300 gas wells. These are controlled from a control room in Sappemeer. The saline groundwater that emerges from the gas production is injected into an empty gas field in the original rock layer at Borgsweer. The natural gas condensate that is released is transported by inland shipping to refineries in Botlek.

After decades of production, the pressure in the Groningen field decreased. The Groningen Long Term Project (GLT) was started in 1997 to counteract the pressure drop. This project was completed in 2009. Compressors are installed that can bring the pressure of the field back to the desired level. The total investment amount was approximately two billion euros. During this renovation, the characteristic flare towers with pilot light disappeared at many locations.

Initially, gas extraction had a strong seasonal pattern. In winter, there was a high demand for gas for heating purposes, hence more was produced. From 2015 the goal has been to achieve equal production throughout the year. This was because the pressure decreased and less could be extracted per day, but also to limit earthquakes. There are three gas storage facilities in the Netherlands: Bergermeer gas storage, Langelo/Norg and Grijpskerk.

Natural gas revenue
Initially, about 70% of the revenues from the Groningen field went to the Dutch state. Minister of Economic Affairs Ruud Lubbers raised this to 85-95% during his term of office (1973-1977). As of January 1, 2018, this was reduced to 73%, in line with other gas fields. The reason for this was that gas extraction decreased, but the costs of the NAM for compensation and reinforcement increased. With the exception of a few years, the Ministry of Economic Affairs has not tracked of how much of the natural gas revenues came from the Groningen field. In the period 2006-2013, natural gas revenues amounted to 69 billion euros from the Groningen field and 29 billion euros from the small fields. Total natural gas revenues, including the small fields, amounted to 417 billion euros until 2018.

Unlike other countries, the Minister of Finance Jelle Zijlstra chose not to establish a separate fund for natural gas revenues. The income in the regular budget made it possible to expand the Dutch welfare state. According to The Economist, this led to the so-called Dutch disease. According to the magazine, the natural gas revenues strengthened the currency too much, making it more difficult for other industries to compete with foreign countries. As a result, unemployment had risen from 1.1% in 1970 to 5.1% in 1978, when The Economist published about the phenomenon. To Groningen's dissatisfaction, the Institute for Research on Public Expenditure concluded in 2006 that only 1% of that fund was returned to the northern provinces Groningen, Drenthe and Friesland.

Land subsidence and earthquakes  

The gas extraction contributes to subsidence above the field. This drop is caused by a drop in pressure in the sandstone where the gas is stored. At its deepest point, the subsidence in 2018 had fallen 37 centimeters compared to 1963, according to the 'Commission on Subsidence'. In 2020, the Commission assumed that this would increase to 46 centimeters in 2080.

It is controversial to what extent this subsidence in itself contributed to building damage above and around the Groningen field. Research commissioned by the Instituut Mijnbouwschade Groningen (IMG) conducted by TNO and TU Delft concluded in 2021 that this was not the case. The subsidence does cause changes in the groundwater level. Damage to waterworks and damage to farmers due to the changing groundwater level was compensated by NAM from the start. The IMG is still investigating whether the changing groundwater level can lead to damage to houses.

Since 1991, the subsidence has also been accompanied by earthquakes above the field. Until 2021, the biggest earthquake, was a magnitude of 3.6 on the Richter Scale. These earthquakes caused extensive damage to buildings above the field. Even with the phasing out of gas production, the earthquakes are expected to continue for a while. In 2013, the NAM CEO also said that it was possible that earthquakes would become heavier, increasing to a magnitude of 5 on the Richter scale. A reinforcement operation was launched to have houses meet the Meijdam standard, whereby the chance of dying per year from an earthquake must be less than 1 in 100,000. 26,000 are made more earthquake-resistant for that reason.

The earthquakes also have immaterial consequences. The earthquakes, for example, cause stress among residents by increasing stress to human living conditions 
, which, according to researchers at the University of Groningen, leads to health problems and even death. The value of homes above and around the Groningen field also fell.

Notes

References

External links

 Groningen gasfield

Midden-Groningen
Geography of Groningen (province)
Natural gas fields in the Netherlands
Geology of the Netherlands